Teeny Ted from Turnip Town (2007), published by Robert Chaplin, is certified by Guinness World Records as the world's smallest reproduction of a printed book. The book was produced in the Nano Imaging Laboratory at Simon Fraser University in Vancouver, British Columbia, Canada, with the assistance of SFU scientists Li Yang and Karen Kavanagh.

The book's size is 0.07 mm x 0.10 mm. The letters are carved into 30 microtablets on a polished piece of single crystalline silicon, using a focused-gallium-ion beam with a minimum diameter of 7 nanometers (this was compared to the head of a pin at 2 mm, 2,000,000 nm, across). The book has its own ISBN, .

The story was written by Malcolm Douglas Chaplin and is "a fable about Teeny Ted’s victory in the turnip contest at the annual county fair."

The book has been published in a limited edition of 100 copies by the laboratory and requires a scanning electron microscope to read the text.

In December 2012, a Library Edition of the book was published with a full title of Teeny Ted from Turnip Town & the Tale of Scale: A Scientific Book of Word Puzzles and an ISBN number . On the title page it is referred to as the "Large Print Edition of the World's Smallest Book". The book was published using funds from a successful Kickstarter campaign with contributors' names shown on the dust jacket.

See also
 Nanotechnology
 Limited edition books
 List of nanotechnology applications
 A Boy and His Atom, a stop-motion film created in a microscopic (molecular) scale

References

External links
 "Tale of Teeny Ted said to be world's smallest book". Reuters. April 11, 2007.

2007 books
Nanotechnology